The 2000–01 Taça de Portugal was the 61st edition of the Portuguese football knockout tournament, organized by the Portuguese Football Federation (FPF). The 2000–01 Taça de Portugal began in September 2000. The final was played on 10 June 2001 at the Estádio Nacional.

Porto were the previous holders, having defeated Sporting CP 2–0 in the previous season's final in cup final which went to a replay. Porto defeated Marítimo, 2–0 in the final to win their eleventh Taça de Portugal. As a result of Porto winning the domestic cup competition, they faced Boavista in the 2001 Supertaça Cândido de Oliveira.

Fifth Round
Ties were played between the 20 January, and the 31 January. Replays were played between the 3–9 January. Benfica's away cup tie to Louletano on 21 December was abandoned due to poor weather conditions, and was rescheduled for 3 January.

Sixth Round
Ties were played on the 16–17 January. Replays were played between the 23 January, and the 7 February. Paços de Ferreira took a bye to the next round.

Quarter-finals
All quarter-final ties were played on the 11–12 February.

Semi-finals
Ties were played on the 21–22 March.

Final

References

Taça de Portugal seasons
Taca De Portugal, 2000-01
2000–01 domestic association football cups